Group F of the 2013 FIBA Asia Championship was to take place from 5 to 7 August 2013. This is the Second round of the 2013 FIBA Asia Championship. The four teams with the best record advance to 2013 FIBA Asia Championship final round.

All games will be played at the Mall of Asia Arena in Pasay, Philippines. The competing teams are top three teams in Group C and Group D.

Group C

Group D

Standings

The results and the points of the matches between the same teams that were already played during the preliminary round shall be taken into account for the second round.
|}

All times are local (UTC+8).

August 5

Iran vs. India

|-
|4 ||align=left|Mohammad Jamshidi ||22 || 1/3 || 33.3 || 0/2 || 0|| 4/4 || 100|| 2|| 1|| 3|| 3|| 0|| 0|| 0||0 ||7 
|-
|5 ||align=left|Aren Davoudi || 13|| 2/3 || 66.7|| 0/0 ||0 || 1/2 || 50|| 0|| 0|| 0|| 1|| 4||0 ||0 || 0|| 7
|-
|6 ||align=left|Javad Davari || 18||2/4  || 50 || 0/1 || 0|| 2/2 || 100||1 ||1 || 2||1 ||2 || 1|| 1||0 || 8
|-
|7 ||align=left|Mehdi Kamrani || 16||  3/8||37.5 || 2/4 ||50 || 1/2 || 50|| 1|| 1|| 2||5 ||0 ||1 ||1 || 0||8 
|-
|8 ||align=left|Saman Veisi ||11 || 1/2 || 50|| 1/1 || 100|| 0/0 || 0|| 0|| 2|| 2|| 4|| 2|| 2|| 0|| 0|| 2
|-
|9 ||align=left|Oshin Sahakian || 14|| 0/0 || 0|| 0/0 || 0|| 0/0 || 0|| 0|| 3|| 3|| 0|| 2|| 1|| 0|| 0|| 0
|-
|10 ||align=left|Hamed Afagh ||22 || 6/10 || 60|| 2/3 || 66.7|| 0/0 || 0|| 1|| 2|| 3|| 3||2 || 1|| 0|| 0|| 16
|-
|11 ||align=left|Hamed Sohrabnejad || 20 || 6/10 || 60|| 5/8 || 62.5 || 1/2 || 50 || 3|| 4|| 7|| 0|| 2|| 2|| 1|| 0|| 14
|-
|12 ||align=left|Asghar Kardoust ||20 || 4/5 || 80|| 4/5 || 80|| 4/5 || 80|| 1|| 5||6 || 0|| 2|| 3||0 ||0 || 12
|-
|13 ||align=left|Rouzbeh Arghavan ||9 || 0/1 || 0|| 0/1 || 0|| 1/2 || 50|| 2|| 2|| 4|| 1|| 1|| 2||0 ||1 || 1
|-
|14 ||align=left|Samad Nikkhah Bahrami || 18|| 6/12 || 50|| 4/8  || 50|| 1/1 || 100|| 0|| 2|| 2|| 3|| 2|| 2|| 1|| 0|| 15
|-
|15 ||align=left|Hamed Haddadi || 16|| 4/4 || 100|| 3/3 || 100|| 3/3 || 100 ||0 || 7|| 7|| 1|| 4|| 1|| 1|| 4|| 12
|-
|align=left colspan=2|Totals || 200 || 35/62|| 56.5|| 21/36||58.3|| 18/23|| 78.3|| 13|| 34|| 47|| 22|| 24|| 16|| 5|| 5||102
|}

|-
|4 ||align=left|Sambhaji Kadam ||colspan=16 align=left|Did not play
|-
|5 ||align=left|Narender Kumar Grewal || 28 || 4/10 || 40 || 4/8 || 50 || 2/3 || 66.7 || 3 || 1 || 4 || 2 || 3 || 2 || 0 || 0 || 10
|-
|6 ||align=left|Pratham Singh || 6 || 1/2 || 50 || 0/0 || 0 || 2/2 || 100 || 0 || 0 || 0 || 1 || 0 || 0 || 0 || 0 || 5
|-00
|7 ||align=left|Vinay Kaushik || 11 || 1/1 || 100 || 1/1 || 100 || 0/0 || 0 || 0 || 0 || 0 || 0 || 1 || 0 || 0 || 0 || 2
|-
|8 ||align=left|Arjun Singh || 3 || 0/0 || 0 || 0/0 || 0 || 0/0 || 0 || 0 || 0 || 0 || 1 || 2 || 3 || 0 || 0 || 0
|-
|9 ||align=left|Vishesh Bhriguvanshi || 30 || 3/17 || 17.6 || 3/12 || 25 || 9/13 || 69.2 || 1 || 2 || 3 || 7 || 4 || 1 || 0 || 0 || 15
|-
|10 ||align=left|Amritpal Singh || 21 || 1/5 || 20 || 1/5 || 20 || 3/6 || 50 || 2 || 5 || 7 || 0 || 3 || 1 || 0 || 0 || 5
|-
|11 ||align=left|Joginder Singh || 22 || 1/7 || 14.3 || 0/2 || 0 || 0/0 || 0 || 1 || 1 || 2 || 1 || 5 || 3 || 0 || 0 || 3
|-
|12 ||align=left|Satnam Singh Bhamara || 8 || 0/0 || 0 || 0/0 || 0 || 0/0 || 0 || 0 || 0 || 0 || 0 || 2 || 1 || 1 || 1 || 0
|-
|13 ||align=left|Amjyot Singh || 31 || 4/10 || 40 || 2/7 || 28.6 || 0/2 || 0 || 2 || 3 || 5 || 1 || 2 || 1 || 0 || 2 || 10
|-
|14 ||align=left|Yadwinder Singh || 22 || 2/5 || 40 || 2/5 || 40 || 0/0 || 0 || 2 || 0 || 2 || 0 || 2 || 1 || 2 || 0 || 4
|-
|15 ||align=left|Rikin Shantilal Pethani || 17 || 2/6 || 33.3 || 2/6 || 33.3 || 0/2 || 0 || 0 || 1 || 1 || 0 || 0 || 0 || 0 || 1 || 4
|-
|align=left colspan=2|Totals || 200|| 19/63 || 30.2 || 15/46|| 32.6|| 16/28|| 57.1|| 14|| 15|| 29|| 13|| 24|| 14|| 3||4||58
|}

Kazakhstan vs. China

|-
|4 ||align=left|Timur Sultanov ||4 ||0/1|| 0|| 0/0|| 0 ||0/0 ||0 ||0 ||0 ||0 ||0 ||0 ||0 ||0 ||0 ||0 
|-
|5 ||align=left|Jerry Jamar Johnson ||35|| 5/12|| 41.7 ||5/7|| 71.4 ||3/4|| 75|| 3 ||0 ||3|| 6|| 2|| 3|| 0|| 0|| 13 
|-
|6 ||align=left|Rustam Murzagaliyev ||25 ||2/4|| 50|| 0/0 ||0 ||0/0|| 0|| 0|| 1|| 1|| 1|| 1|| 2|| 0 ||0 ||6 
|-00
|7 ||align=left|Mikhail Yevstigneyev  ||21 ||1/4 ||25|| 1/4 ||25 ||9/10|| 90|| 2 ||6 ||8 ||1 ||3 ||0|| 0|| 0|| 11 
|-
|8 ||align=left|Vitaliy Lapchenko ||21 ||4/8|| 50 ||3/6 ||50|| 0/0 ||0 ||0|| 5 ||5 ||0|| 2|| 0|| 0 ||1|| 9 
|-
|9 ||align=left|Nikolay Bazhini ||7 ||0/1 ||0 ||0/1 ||0 ||0/2 ||0 ||0|| 0 ||0 ||0 ||0 ||1 ||0|| 0 ||0 
|-
|10 ||align=left|Konstantin Dvirnyy ||colspan=16 align=left|Did not play
|-
|11 ||align=left|Anton Ponomarev  ||22 ||3/6 ||50 ||3/4|| 75|| 0/0 ||0|| 5|| 5|| 10 ||2 ||3|| 0 ||0|| 0|| 6 
|-
|12 ||align=left|Dmitriy Klimov ||16 ||2/2|| 100|| 1/1 ||100|| 2/2 ||100 ||1 ||2|| 3 ||1|| 5|| 3 ||0 ||0|| 7 
|-
|13 ||align=left|Rustam Yargaliyev ||26 ||3/13|| 23.1|| 2/6|| 33.3|| 2/2 ||100|| 0|| 3|| 3 ||2 ||4 ||2|| 0|| 0|| 9 
|-
|14 ||align=left|Leonid Bondarovich ||8 ||3/4|| 75|| 3/4 ||75 ||0/0 ||0 ||1 ||3 ||4 ||0|| 5 ||1|| 0|| 1|| 6 
|-
|15 ||align=left|Alexander Zhigulin || 14 ||0/4 ||0 ||0/2|| 0|| 0/0 ||0|| 1 ||0 ||1|| 0 ||5|| 0|| 0|| 0 ||0 
|-
|align=left colspan=2|Totals|| 200|| 23/59|| 39 ||18/35|| 51.4|| 16/20|| 80 ||13 ||27 ||40 ||13 ||30 ||13 ||0 ||2 ||67 
|}

|-
|4 ||align=left|Guo Ailun ||7|| 1/2|| 50|| 1/2|| 50|| 0/0|| 0|| 0|| 1|| 1|| 0 ||0 ||0 ||0|| 0 ||2 
|-
|5 ||align=left|Liu Xiaoyu ||2 ||0/0 ||0 ||0/0 ||0 ||0/0 ||0|| 0|| 0|| 0|| 0 ||0 ||0|| 0|| 0|| 0 
|-
|6 ||align=left|Chen Jianghua ||25 ||1/2 ||50 ||1/1 ||100 ||2/2 ||100 ||0 ||4 ||4 ||2 ||1|| 2 ||0 ||0 ||4 
|-
|7 ||align=left|Wang Shipeng ||33|| 3/8 ||37.5 ||1/2 ||50 ||1/1 ||100|| 0 ||3 ||3 ||7|| 2|| 0||1 ||0 ||9 
|-
|8 ||align=left|Zhu Fangyu ||29 ||5/11 ||45.5|| 2/7 ||28.6 ||2/2|| 100 ||2 ||2 ||4 ||1 ||4 ||3 ||0|| 0 ||15 
|-
|9 ||align=left|Sun Yue ||27 ||1/9 ||11.1 ||0/2 ||0 ||3/4|| 75|| 0 ||1 ||1 ||3 ||2 ||1 ||0|| 0 ||6 
|-
|10 ||align=left|Li Xiaoxu ||12 ||1/1|| 100 ||1/1 ||100|| 1/3|| 33.3|| 0 ||0 ||0 ||0 ||4 ||1 ||0|| 0 ||3 
|-
|11 ||align=left|Yi Jianlian ||colspan=16 align=left|Did not play
|-
|12 ||align=left|Zhang Bo ||7 ||0/1|| 0|| 0/1 ||0 ||1/2|| 50|| 1 ||1|| 2|| 0|| 1 ||1|| 0|| 0 ||1 
|-
|13 ||align=left|Wang Zhelin ||9 ||1/1 ||100 ||1/1 ||100|| 2/2 ||100 ||3 ||1 ||4 ||1|| 4 ||1 ||0 ||0 ||4 
|-
|14 ||align=left|Wang Zhizhi ||22 ||4/12 ||33.3 ||4/11 ||36.4 ||4/4 ||100|| 0 ||6 ||6 || 0 ||0 ||0 ||0 ||1 ||12 
|-
|15 ||align=left|Zhou Peng ||28 ||6/12 ||50|| 5/10 ||50 ||4/10 ||40|| 5 ||3 ||8 ||0 ||3|| 1|| 0 ||1 ||17 
|-
|align=left colspan=2|Totals ||200 ||23/59 ||39 ||16/38|| 42.1 ||20/30 ||66.7|| 11 ||24 ||35 ||14|| 21|| 10 ||1 ||2 ||73 
|}

Korea vs. Bahrain

|-
|4 ||align=left|Kim Min-Goo || 17:50 || 5-10 || 50 || 2-7 || 29 || 0-0 || 0 || 0 || 1 || 1 || 3 || 1 || 2 || 1 || 0 || 12 
|-
|5 ||align=left|Kim Sun-Hyung || 20:00 || 6-9 || 67 || 0-2 || 0 || 2-2 || 100 || 2 || 1 || 3 || 4 || 2 || 1 || 0 || 3 || 14
|-
|6 ||align=left|Yang Dong-Geun || 16:13 || 1-3 || 33 || 0-2 || 0 || 0-0 || 0 || 1 || 1 || 2 || 3 || 1 || 1 || 0 || 0 || 2 
|-
|7 ||align=left|Kim Tae-Sul || 20:00 || 5-6 || 83 || 2-2 || 100 || 5-5 || 100 || 0 || 1 || 1 || 7 || 1 || 4 || 0 || 3 || 17
|-
|8 ||align=left|Moon Seong-Gon ||07:52 || 1-4 || 25 || 0-3 || 0 || 0-0 || 0 || 0 || 1 || 1 || 0 || 1 || 1 || 0 || 2 || 2 
|-
|9 ||align=left|Yun Ho-Young || 11:19 || 0-1 || 0 || 0-1 || 0 || 0-0 || 0 || 1 || 0 || 1 || 1 || 1 || 0 || 1 || 0 || 0
|-
|10 ||align=left|Cho Sung-Min || 24:12 || 6-9 || 67 || 2-5 || 40 || 0-0 || 0 || 0 || 1 || 1 || 4 || 1 || 2 || 0 || 2 || 14
|-
|11 ||align=left|Kim Joo-Sung || 25:48 || 3-6 || 50 || 0-0 || 0 || 5-6 || 83 || 4 || 5 || 9 || 2 || 3 || 0 || 0 || 3 || 11
|-
|12 ||align=left|Kim Jong-Kyu || 16:47 || 1-2 || 50 || 0-0 || 0 || 3-4 || 75 || 2 || 5 || 7 || 1 || 3 || 0 || 1 || 1 || 5
|-
|13 ||align=left|Choi Jun-Yong || 10:00 || 1-4 || 25 || 0-2 || 0 || 0-2 || 0 || 0 || 2 || 2 || 2 || 0 || 1 || 1 || 0 || 2
|-
|14 ||align=left|Lee Seung-Jun || 12:47 || 2-3 || 67 || 0-0 || 0 || 0-2 || 0 || 0 || 4 || 4 || 0 || 0 || 0 || 1 || 2 || 4
|-
|15 ||align=left|Lee Jong-Hyun || 17:07 || 5-7 || 71 || 0-0 || 0 || 3-3 || 100 || 2 || 2 || 4 || 1 || 1 || 0 || 4 || 1 || 13
|-
|align=left colspan=2|Totals || || 36-64 || 56 || 6-24 || 25 || 18-24 || 75 || 12 || 24 || 36 || 28 || 15 || 12 || 9 || 17 || 96
|}

|-
|4 ||align=left|Mohamed Ebrahim || 13:05 || 0-4 || 0 || 0-0 || 0 || 0-0 || 0 || 1 || 1 || 2 || 0 || 3 || 0 || 0 || 1 || 0
|-
|5 ||align=left|Hussain Al-Tawash || colspan=16 align=left|Did not play
|-
|6 ||align=left|Mohamed Kawaid || 26:57 || 1-7 || 14 || 1-2 || 50 || 0-0 || 0 || 0 || 3 || 3 || 2 || 4 || 1 || 1 || 1 || 3
|-
|7 ||align=left|Bader Malabes || 25:04 || 2-7 || 29 || 0-1 || 0 || 0-0 || 0 || 0 || 0 || 0 || 1 || 2 || 1 || 0 || 1 || 4
|-
|8 ||align=left|Ahmed Ismaeel || 28:59 || 6-10 || 60 || 3-5 || 60 || 4-6 || 67 || 1 || 2 || 3 || 1 || 4 || 0 || 1 || 2 || 19
|-
|9 ||align=left|Mohamed Alderazi || 20:20 || 3-3 || 100 || 1-1 || 100 || 0-0 || 0 || 1 || 2 || 3 || 0 || 3 || 1 || 0 || 2 || 7
|-
|10 ||align=left|Abdul-Rahman Mubarak || 20:00 || 2-4 || 50 || 2-3 || 67 || 0-0 || 0 || 0 || 0 || 0 || 0 || 7 || 0 || 0 || 4 || 6
|-
|11 ||align=left|Subah Azzam || 15:52 || 1-2 || 50 || 0-0 || 0 || 4-6 || 67 || 1 || 1 || 2 || 0 || 1 || 0 || 1 || 4 || 6
|-
|12 ||align=left|Chester Giles || colspan=16 align=left|Did not play
|-
|13 ||align=left|Yunes Kawaid || 11:26 || 2-4 || 50 || 0-0 || 0 || 0-0 || 0 || 0 || 0 || 0 || 0 || 2 || 0 || 0 || 0 || 4
|-
|14 ||align=left|Ahmed Akber || 29:20 || 0-3 || 0 || 0-0 || 0 || 2-2 || 100 || 0 || 5 || 5 || 0 || 1 || 0 || 1 || 4 || 2
|-
|15 ||align=left|Ahmed Aman || 08:53 || 0-0 || 0 || 0-0 || 0 || 0-0 || 0 || 0 || 1 || 1 || 0 || 1 || 0 || 0 || 3 || 0
|-
|align=left colspan=2|Totals || || 17-44 || 39 || 7-12 || 58 || 10-14 || 71 || 4 || 15 || 19 || 4 || 28 || 3 || 4 || 22 || 51
|}

August 6

Bahrain vs. Iran

|-
|4 ||align=left|Mohamed Ebrahim || colspan=16 align=left|Did not play
|-
|5 ||align=left|Hussain Al-Tawash || 25:43 || 5-10 || 50 || 4-6 || 67 || 1-1 || 100 || 1 || 1 || 2 || 3 || 2 || 0 || 0 || 2 || 15
|-
|6 ||align=left|Mohamed Kawaid || 18:37 || 2-6 || 33 || 0-2 || 0 || 0-0 || 0 || 0 || 3 || 3 || 1 || 1 || 0 || 0 || 1 || 4
|-
|7 ||align=left|Bader Malabes || 17:19 || 3-10 || 30 || 1-5 || 20 || 0-0 || 0 || 0 || 1 || 1 || 2 || 1 || 0 || 0 || 0 || 7
|-
|8 ||align=left|Ahmed Ismaeel || 12:56 || 1-4 || 25 || 1-2 || 50 || 0-0 || 0 || 0 || 3 || 3 || 1 || 1 || 1 || 0 || 0 || 3
|-
|9 ||align=left|Mohamed Alderazi || 32:36 || 6-12 || 50 || 1-4 || 25 || 1-1 || 100 || 0 || 4 || 4 || 4 || 4 || 2 || 0 || 3 || 14
|-
|10 ||align=left|Abdul-Rahman Mubarak || 02:41 || 1-2 || 50 || 0-1 || 0 || 0-0 || 0 || 0 || 0 || 0 || 0 || 0 || 1 || 0 || 0 || 2
|-
|11 ||align=left|Subah Azzam || 23:39 || 0-5 || 0 || 0-2 || 0 || 0-0 || 0 || 1 || 3 || 4 || 0 || 1 || 1 || 0 || 1 || 0
|-
|12 ||align=left|Chester Giles || colspan=16 align=left|Did not play
|-
|13 ||align=left|Yunes Kawaid || 26:24 || 4-6 || 67 || 0-0 || 0 || 0-0 || 0 || 1 || 4 || 5 || 1 || 0 || 0 || 0 || 1 || 8
|-
|14 ||align=left|Ahmed Akber || 22:02 || 0-2 || 0 || 0-0 || 0 || 0-0 || 0 || 2 || 1 || 3 || 0 || 1 || 1 || 3 || 4 || 0
|-
|15 ||align=left|Ahmed Aman || 17:57 || 1-4 || 25 || 1-3 || 33 || 0-0 || 0 || 2 || 2 || 4 || 0 || 2 || 0 || 1 || 4 || 3
|-
|align=left colspan=2|Totals || || 23-61 || 38 || 8-25 || 32 || 2-2 || 100 || 7 || 22 || 29 || 12 || 13 || 6 || 4 || 16 || 56
|}

|-
|4 ||align=left|Mohammad Jamshidi || 13:02 || 0-3 || 0 || 0-3 || 0 || 0-2 || 0 || 0 || 1 || 1 || 0 || 2 || 0 || 0 || 2 || 0
|-
|5 ||align=left|Aren Davoudi || 14:14 || 0-2 || 0 || 0-2 || 0 || 2-2 || 100 || 1 || 0 || 1 || 0 || 0 || 0 || 0 || 2 || 2
|-
|6 ||align=left|Javad Davari || 17:18 || 0-3 || 0 || 0-3 || 0 || 0-0 || 0 || 1 || 0 || 1 || 1 || 1 || 0 || 0 || 1 || 0
|-
|7 ||align=left|Mehdi Kamrani || 17:28 || 4-6 || 67 || 1-2 || 50 || 0-0 || 0 || 1 || 1 || 2 || 11 || 1 || 0 || 0 || 2 || 9
|-
|8 ||align=left|Saman Veisi || 18:40 || 2-9 || 22 || 0-2 || 0 || 1-2 || 50 || 2 || 4 || 6 || 0 || 3 || 0 || 0 || 0 || 5
|-
|9 ||align=left|Oshin Sahakian || 28:58 || 2-3 || 67 || 0-1 || 0 || 0-0 || 0 || 0 || 10 || 10 || 3 || 1 || 0 || 0 || 2 || 4
|-
|10 ||align=left|Hamed Afagh || 16:33 || 4-6 || 67 || 4-5 || 80 || 3-3 || 100 || 1 || 1 || 2 || 3 || 0 || 2 || 0 || 0 || 15
|-
|11 ||align=left|Hamed Sohrabnejad || 11:01 || 0-3 || 0 || 0-2 || 0 || 0-2 || 0 || 0 || 1 || 1 || 0 || 1 || 0 || 0 || 0 || 0 
|-
|12 ||align=left|Asghar Kardoust || 17:02 || 3-6 || 50 || 0-0 || 0 || 6-8 || 75 || 3 || 1 || 4 || 1 || 0 || 0 || 0 || 0 || 12
|-
|13 ||align=left|Rouzbeh Arghavan || 05:28 || 1-2 || 50 || 0-0 || 0 || 0-0 || 0 || 1 || 0 || 1 || 0 || 0 || 0 || 0 || 0 || 2
|-
|14 ||align=left|Samad Nikkhah Bahrami || 22:41 || 7-11 || 64 || 3-3 || 100 || 0-0 || 0 || 0 || 6 || 6 || 5 || 2 || 2 || 0 || 0 || 17 
|-
|15 ||align=left|Hamed Haddadi || 17:28 || 4-6 || 67 || 0-0 || 0 || 1-2 || 50 || 3 || 5 || 8 || 0 || 1 || 0 || 2 || 2 || 9 
|-
|align=left colspan=2|Totals || || 27-60 || 45 || 8-23 || 35 || 13-21 || 62 || 13 || 30 || 43 || 24 || 12 || 4 || 2 || 11 || 75
|}

China vs. India

|-
|4 ||align=left|Guo Ailun || 20:11 || 5-6 || 83 || 1-1 || 100 || 5-5 || 100 || 0 || 1 || 1 || 2 || 1 || 0 || 0 || 3 || 16
|-
|5 ||align=left|Liu Xiaoyu || colspan=16 align=left|Did not play
|-
|6 ||align=left|Chen Jianghua || 18:23 || 0-1 || 0 || 0-1 || 0 || 0-0 || 0 || 0 || 2 || 2 || 1 || 1 || 0 || 0 || 0 || 0
|-
|7 ||align=left|Wang Shipeng || 19:59 || 1-4 || 25 || 1-4 || 25 || 0-0 || 0 || 1 || 4 || 5 || 1 || 1 || 0 || 0 || 2 || 3
|-
|8 ||align=left|Zhu Fangyu || 18:42 || 2-5 || 40 || 2-5 || 40 || 1-2 || 50 || 1 || 2 || 3 || 0 || 0 || 0 || 1 || 3 || 7
|-
|9 ||align=left|Sun Yue || 21:30 || 1-6 || 17 || 0-3 || 0 || 2-2 || 100 || 1 || 1 || 2 || 3 || 3 || 1 || 0 || 3 || 4
|-
|10 ||align=left|Li Xiaoxu || 24:17 || 2-5 || 40 || 0-0 || 0 || 1-2 || 50 || 3 || 5 || 8 || 0 || 1 || 0 || 0 || 2 || 5
|-
|11 ||align=left|Yi Jianlian || colspan=16 align=left|Did not play
|-
|12 ||align=left|Zhang Bo || 19:54 || 1-7 || 14 || 0-4 || 0 || 2-2 || 100 || 0 || 2 || 2 || 5 || 1 || 1 || 0 || 1 || 4
|-
|13 ||align=left|Wang Zhelin || 26:54 || 6-8 || 75 || 0-0 || 0 || 6-10 || 60 || 3 || 6 || 9 || 1 || 1 || 3 || 0 || 4 || 18
|-
|14 ||align=left|Wang Zhizhi || 09:12 || 5-9 || 56 || 1-1 || 100 || 2-4 || 50 || 2 || 3 || 5 || 1 || 0 || 0 || 1 || 0 || 13
|-
|15 ||align=left|Zhou Peng || 20:53 || 3-8 || 38 || 2-4 || 50 || 1-4 || 25 || 0 || 2 || 2 || 2 || 0 || 1 || 1 || 1 || 9
|-
|align=left colspan=2|Totals || || 26-59 || 44 || 7-23 || 30 || 20-31 || 65 || 11 || 28 || 39 || 16 || 9 || 6 || 3 || 19 || 79
|}

|-
|4 ||align=left|Sambhaji Kadam || colspan=16 align=left|Did not play
|-
|5 ||align=left|Narender Kumar Grewal || 23:25 || 4-11 || 36 || 1-1 || 100 || 0-0 || 0 || 0 || 0 || 0 || 3 || 1 || 0 || 0 || 2 || 9
|-
|6 ||align=left|Pratham Singh || 12:00 || 0-4 || 0 || 0-2 || 0 || 0-0 || 0 || 1 || 1 || 2 || 0 || 0 || 0 || 0 || 0 || 0
|-
|7 ||align=left|Vinay Kaushik || 02:27 || 0-0 || 0 || 0-0 || 0 || 0-0 || 0 || 0 || 0 || 0 || 0 || 1 || 0 || 0 || 2 || 0
|-
|8 ||align=left|Arjun Singh || colspan=16 align=left|Did not play
|-
|9 ||align=left|Vishesh Bhriguvanshi || 34:49 || 1-3 || 33 || 0-2 || 0 || 0-0 || 0 || 0 || 6 || 6 || 1 || 6 || 1 || 1 || 2 || 2
|-
|10 ||align=left|Amritpal Singh || 21:28 || 3-9 || 33 || 0-0 || 0 || 3-4 || 75 || 0 || 5 || 5 || 0 || 3 || 1 || 0 || 5 || 9
|-
|11 ||align=left|Joginder Singh || 21:39 || 0-3 || 0 || 0-3 || 0 || 0-0 || 0 || 1 || 1 || 2 || 1 || 0 || 1 || 0 || 1 || 0
|-
|12 ||align=left|Satnam Singh Bhamara || 08:13 || 1-3 || 33 || 0-0 || 0 || 0-0 || 0 || 0 || 1 || 1 || 0 || 1 || 0 || 0 || 2 || 2
|-
|13 ||align=left|Amjyot Singh || 37:43 || 5-9 || 56 || 0-2 || 0 || 6-9 || 67 || 1 || 3 || 4 || 3 || 3 || 0 || 1 || 2 || 16 
|-
|14 ||align=left|Yadwinder Singh || 25:06 || 1-3 || 33 || 0-1 || 0 || 0-0 || 0 || 1 || 5 || 6 || 0 || 2 || 0 || 0 || 3 || 2
|-
|15 ||align=left|Rikin Shantilal Pethani || 13:05 || 2-5 || 40 || 0-0 || 0 || 1-1 || 100 || 0 || 5 || 5 || 0 || 3 || 0 || 0 || 5 || 5
|-
|align=left colspan=2|Totals || || 17-51 || 33 || 1-11 || 9 || 10-14 || 71 || 4 || 27 || 31 || 8 || 20 || 3 || 2 || 24 || 45
|}

Kazakhstan vs. Korea

|-
|4 ||align=left|Timur Sultanov || 21:04 || 3-6 || 50 || 3-4 || 75 || 0-0 || 0 || 0 || 1 || 1 || 1 || 2 || 1 || 0 || 0 || 9
|-
|5 ||align=left|Jerry Jamar Johnson || 22:39 || 6-7 || 86 || 3-4 || 75 || 0-0 || 0 || 0 || 2 || 2 || 2 || 2 || 0 || 0 || 2 || 15
|-
|6 ||align=left|Rustam Murzagaliyev || 27:41 || 2-5 || 40 || 0-1 || 0 || 0-0 || 0 || 0 || 1 || 1 || 0 || 2 || 1 || 0 || 1 || 4
|-
|7 ||align=left|Mikhail Yevstigneyev || 12:03 || 1-5 || 20 || 0-0 || 0 || 1-2 || 50 || 1 || 2 || 3 || 0 || 2 || 0 || 0 || 2 || 3
|-
|8 ||align=left|Vitaliy Lapchenko || 13:29 || 0-8 || 0 || 0-4 || 0 || 0-0 || 0 || 1 || 2 || 3 || 0 || 0 || 0 || 0 || 5 || 0
|-
|9 ||align=left|Nikolay Bazhini || 10:19 || 0-2 || 0 || 0-1 || 0 || 0-0 || 0 || 0 || 0 || 0 || 1 || 1 || 0 || 0 || 2 || 0
|-
|10 ||align=left|Konstantin Dvirnyy || colspan=16 align=left|Did not play
|-
|11 ||align=left|Anton Ponomarev || 26:49 || 3-12 || 25 || 0-5 || 0 || 0-0 || 0 || 2 || 4 || 6 || 0 || 1 || 0 || 0 || 5 || 6
|-
|12 ||align=left|Dmitriy Klimov || 17:09 || 0-2 || 0 || 0-1 || 0 || 0-0 || 0 || 1 || 2 || 3 || 1 || 0 || 0 || 0 || 1 || 0
|-
|13 ||align=left|Rustam Yargaliyev || 21:59 || 2-11 || 18 || 0-2 || 0 || 0-0 || 0 || 1 || 4 || 5 || 0 || 0 || 0 || 0 || 0 || 4
|-
|14 ||align=left|Leonid Bondarovich || 14:11 || 3-4 || 75 || 0-0 || 0 || 0-0 || 0 || 4 || 0 || 4 || 0 || 2 || 0 || 0 || 2 || 6
|-
|15 ||align=left|Alexander Zhigulin || 12:30 || 0-1 || 0 || 0-1 || 0 || 0-2 || 0 || 1 || 1 || 2 || 0 || 0 || 1 || 0 || 1 || 0
|-
|align=left colspan=2|Totals || || 20-63 || 32 || 6-23 || 26 || 1-4 || 25 || 11 || 19 || 30 || 5 || 12 || 3 || 0 || 21 || 47
|}

|-
|4 ||align=left|Kim Min-Goo || 22:26 || 5-14 || 36 || 4-10 || 40 || 0-1 || 0 || 1 || 5 || 6 || 1 || 1 || 0 || 1 || 0 || 14
|-
|5 ||align=left|Kim Sun-Hyung || 12:17 || 6-6 || 100 || 1-1 || 100 || 1-2 || 50 || 1 || 0 || 1 || 0 || 0 || 1 || 0 || 1 || 14
|-
|6 ||align=left|Yang Dong-Geun || 19:03 || 3-6 || 50 || 0-2 || 0 || 0-0 || 0 || 0 || 3 || 3 || 2 || 1 || 1 || 0 || 2 || 6
|-
|7 ||align=left|Kim Tae-Sul || 20:56 || 0-2 || 0 || 0-0 || 0 || 0-0 || 0 || 2 || 0 || 2 || 4 || 1 || 1 || 0 || 2 || 0
|-
|8 ||align=left|Moon Seong-Gon || 01:59 || 1-3 || 33 || 1-3 || 33 || 0-0 || 0 || 0 || 0 || 0 || 0 || 0 || 0 || 0 || 0 || 3
|-
|9 ||align=left|Yun Ho-Young || 11:56 || 1-3 || 33 || 0-0 || 0 || 0-0 || 0 || 1 || 1 || 2 || 2 || 0 || 0 || 0 || 0 || 2
|-
|10 ||align=left|Cho Sung-Min || 21:43 || 5-12 || 42 || 2-6 || 33 || 0-0 || 0 || 0 || 3 || 3 || 0 || 1 || 1 || 0 || 2 || 12
|-
|11 ||align=left|Kim Joo-Sung || 17:09 || 1-2 || 50 || 0-0 || 0 || 0-0 || 0 || 2 || 4 || 6 || 3 || 3 || 0 || 0 || 2 || 2
|-
|12 ||align=left|Kim Jong-Kyu || 18:33 || 0-1 || 0 || 0-0 || 0 || 2-2 || 100 || 1 || 1 || 2 || 1 || 0 || 0 || 0 || 2 || 2
|-
|13 ||align=left|Choi Jun-Yong || 09:35 || 0-1 || 0 || 0-1 || 0 || 1-2 || 50 || 1 || 3 || 4 || 2 || 3 || 0 || 0 || 0 || 1
|-
|14 ||align=left|Lee Seung-Jun || 15:40 || 3-5 || 60 || 1-2 || 50 || 0-1 || 0 || 1 || 4 || 5 || 0 || 1 || 0 || 0 || 1 || 7
|-
|15 ||align=left|Lee Jong-Hyun || 28:37 || 2-5 || 40 || 0-0 || 0 || 4-5 || 80 || 2 || 4 || 6 || 3 || 2 || 0 || 1 || 0 || 8
|-
|align=left colspan=2|Totals || || 27-60 || 45 || 9-25 || 36 || 8-13 || 62 || 12 || 28 || 40 || 18 || 13 || 4 || 2 || 12 || 71
|}

August 7

Iran vs. Kazakhstan

|-
|4 ||align=left|Mohammad Jamshidi || 18:38 || 1-3 || 33 || 0-2 || 0 || 1-2 || 50 || 0 || 2 || 2 || 3 || 2 || 0 || 0 || 1 || 3
|-
|5 ||align=left|Aren Davoudi || 15:44 || 3-4 || 75 || 1-2 || 50 || 0-0 || 0 || 0 || 1 || 1 || 2 || 0 || 2 || 0 || 2 || 7
|-
|6 ||align=left|Javad Davari || 11:53 || 1-3 || 33 || 1-2 || 50 || 0-0 || 0 || 0 || 2 || 2 || 1 || 3 || 0 || 0 || 1 || 3
|-
|7 ||align=left|Mehdi Kamrani || 21:12 || 5-8 || 63 || 1-3 || 33 || 0-0 || 0 || 0 || 2 || 2 || 7 || 2 || 2 || 0 || 1 || 11
|-
|8 ||align=left|Saman Veisi || 13:09 || 3-4 || 75 || 1-2 || 50 || 2-2 || 100 || 0 || 1 || 1 || 0 || 0 || 0 || 0 || 0 || 9
|-
|9 ||align=left|Oshin Sahakian || 21:30 || 1-2 || 50 || 0-0 || 0 || 0-0 || 0 || 2 || 1 || 3 || 0 || 2 || 0 || 0 || 1 || 2
|-
|10 ||align=left|Hamed Afagh || 20:12 || 6-9 || 67 || 1-2 || 50 || 2-3 || 67 || 2 || 0 || 2 || 2 || 0 || 3 || 0 || 1 || 15
|-
|11 ||align=left|Hamed Sohrabnejad || 09:54 || 2-3 || 67 || 0-0 || 0 || 2-2 || 100 || 0 || 0 || 0 || 1 || 0 || 0 || 0 || 1 || 6
|-
|12 ||align=left|Asghar Kardoust || 18:21 || 3-4 || 75 || 0-0 || 0 || 1-2 || 50 || 3 || 3 || 6 || 1 || 2 || 0 || 0 || 2 || 7
|-
|13 ||align=left|Rouzbeh Arghavan || 12:12 || 1-2 || 50 || 0-0 || 0 || 0-0 || 0 || 0 || 1 || 1 || 1 || 0 || 0 || 0 || 1 || 2
|-
|14 ||align=left|Samad Nikkhah Bahrami || 19:08 || 2-4 || 50 || 0-1 || 0 || 0-2 || 0 || 0 || 2 || 2 || 2 || 2 || 1 || 0 || 3 || 4
|-
|15 ||align=left|Hamed Haddadi || 18:00 || 6-11 || 55 || 0-0 || 0 || 4-7 || 57 || 3 || 6 || 9 || 0 || 1 || 0 || 1 || 1 || 16
|-
|align=left colspan=2|Totals || || 34-57 || 60 || 5-14 || 36 || 12-20 || 60 || 10 || 21 || 31 || 20 || 14 || 8 || 1 || 15 || 85
|}

|-
|4 ||align=left|Timur Sultanov || 17:22 || 2-3 || 67 || 1-2 || 50 || 3-4 || 75 || 0 || 0 || 0 || 0 || 1 || 0 || 0 || 5 || 8
|-
|5 ||align=left|Jerry Jamar Johnson || colspan=16 align=left|Did not play
|-
|6 ||align=left|Rustam Murzagaliyev || 29:58 || 0-4 || 0 || 0-3 || 0 || 0-0 || 0 || 0 || 2 || 2 || 5 || 4 || 0 || 1 || 1 || 0
|-
|7 ||align=left|Mikhail Yevstigneyev || colspan=16 align=left|Did not play
|-
|8 ||align=left|Vitaliy Lapchenko || 27:37 || 3-11 || 27 || 0-0 || 0 || 2-2 || 100 || 4 || 1 || 5 || 1 || 2 || 1 || 1 || 1 || 8
|-
|9 ||align=left|Nikolay Bazhini || 22:35 || 2-5 || 40 || 2-4 || 50 || 0-0 || 0 || 2 || 2 || 4 || 2 || 0 || 0 || 0 || 0 || 6
|-
|10 ||align=left|Konstantin Dvirnyy || colspan=16 align=left|Did not play
|-
|11 ||align=left|Anton Ponomarev || 16:02 || 2-5 || 40 || 0-0 || 0 || 1-2 || 50 || 2 || 5 || 7 || 0 || 3 || 1 || 0 || 5 || 5
|-
|12 ||align=left|Dmitriy Klimov || 25:19 || 3-7 || 43 || 1-4 || 25 || 0-0 || 0 || 1 || 1 || 2 || 1 || 2 || 4 || 0 || 1 || 7
|-
|13 ||align=left|Rustam Yargaliyev || 29:58 || 6-13 || 46 || 2-7 || 29 || 0-0 || 0 || 0 || 1 || 1 || 2 || 5 || 0 || 0 || 1 || 14
|-
|14 ||align=left|Leonid Bondarovich || 15:46 || 0-4 || 0 || 0-0 || 0 || 0-0 || 0 || 0 || 1 || 1 || 0 || 3 || 0 || 0 || 2 || 0
|-
|15 ||align=left|Alexander Zhigulin || 15:18 || 1-3 || 33 || 1-1 || 100 || 2-2 || 100 || 2 || 1 || 3 || 1 || 1 || 0 || 0 || 5 || 5 
|-
|align=left colspan=2|Totals || || 19-55 || 35 || 7-21 || 33 || 8-10 || 80 || 11 || 14 || 25 || 12 || 21 || 6 || 2 || 21 || 53
|}

Bahrain vs. China

|-
|4 ||align=left|Mohamed Ebrahim || colspan=16 align=left|Did not play
|-
|5 ||align=left|Hussain Al-Tawash || 32:55 || 6-14 || 43 || 1-3 || 33 || 0-0 || 0 || 0 || 0 || 0 || 3 || 2 || 0 || 0 || 2 || 13
|-
|6 ||align=left|Mohamed Kawaid || 13:56 || 1-7 || 14 || 1-3 || 33 || 0-0 || 0 || 1 || 2 || 3 || 0 || 0 || 1 || 1 || 1 || 3
|-
|7 ||align=left|Bader Malabes || 04:16 || 0-2 || 0 || 0-1 || 0 || 0-0 || 0 || 0 || 1 || 1 || 0 || 0 || 0 || 0 || 0 || 0
|-
|8 ||align=left|Ahmed Ismaeel || colspan=16 align=left|Did not play
|-
|9 ||align=left|Mohamed Alderazi || 32:30 || 4-12 || 33 || 0-3 || 0 || 1-2 || 50 || 1 || 7 || 8 || 1 || 0 || 0 || 0 || 1 || 9
|-
|10 ||align=left|Abdul-Rahman Mubarak || 24:49 || 2-7 || 29 || 1-3 || 33 || 0-0 || 0 || 0 || 1 || 1 || 2 || 1 || 0 || 0 || 0 || 5
|-
|11 ||align=left|Subah Azzam || 29:15 || 5-7 || 71 || 0-1 || 0 || 3-3 || 100 || 1 || 3 || 4 || 5 || 0 || 1 || 0 || 0 || 13
|-
|12 ||align=left|Chester Giles || colspan=16 align=left|Did not play
|-
|13 ||align=left|Yunes Kawaid || 25:28 || 3-7 || 43 || 0-1 || 0 || 4-4 || 100 || 0 || 3 || 3 || 2 || 2 || 1 || 0 || 1 || 10
|-
|14 ||align=left|Ahmed Akber || 21:23 || 5-10 || 50 || 0-0 || 0 || 0-2 || 0 || 2 || 3 || 5 || 1 || 0 || 0 || 2 || 5 || 10
|-
|15 ||align=left|Ahmed Aman || 15:23 || 1-4 || 25 || 1-3 || 33 || 0-0 || 0 || 0 || 3 || 3 || 0 || 2 || 2 || 0 || 3 || 3
|-
|align=left colspan=2|Totals || || 27-70 || 39 || 4-18 || 22 || 8-11 || 73 || 5 || 23 || 28 || 14 || 7 || 5 || 3 || 13 || 66
|}

|-
|4 ||align=left|Guo Ailun || 20:11 || 4-8 || 50 || 2-5 || 40 || 1-2 || 50 || 0 || 1 || 1 || 1 || 0 || 0 || 0 || 0 || 11
|-
|5 ||align=left|Liu Xiaoyu || colspan=16 align=left|Did not play
|-
|6 ||align=left|Chen Jianghua ||16:55 || 5-9 || 56 || 1-3 || 33 || 2-2 || 100 || 1 || 1 || 2 || 2 || 1 || 0 || 0 || 0 || 13
|-
|7 ||align=left|Wang Shipeng ||19:22 || 2-4 || 50 || 2-4 || 50 || 0-0 || 0 || 0 || 2 || 2 || 2 || 1 || 0 || 0 || 1 || 6
|-
|8 ||align=left|Zhu Fangyu || 24:34 || 2-5 || 40 || 0-2 || 0 || 1-2 || 50 || 0 || 3 || 3 || 3 || 2 || 0 || 0 || 2 || 5
|-
|9 ||align=left|Sun Yue || 13:44 || 1-5 || 20 || 0-2 || 0 || 0-0 || 0 || 0 || 3 || 3 || 1 || 0 || 0 || 0 || 2 || 2
|-
|10 ||align=left|Li Xiaoxu ||11:46 || 1-4 || 25 || 0-0 || 0 || 0-0 || 0 || 1 || 5 || 6 || 0 || 1 || 0 || 0 || 1 || 2
|-
|11 ||align=left|Yi Jianlian || 12:50 || 5-7 || 71 || 1-1 || 100 || 1-1 || 100 || 1 || 5 || 6 || 0 || 0 || 0 || 0 || 0 || 12
|-
|12 ||align=left|Zhang Bo || 19:44 || 1-4 || 25 || 0-2 || 0 || 3-4 || 75 || 2 || 0 || 2 || 4 || 0 || 1 || 0 || 1 || 5
|-
|13 ||align=left|Wang Zhelin || 20:56 || 3-7 || 43 || 0-0 || 0 || 5-6 || 83 || 2 || 7 || 9 || 1 || 1 || 0 || 1 || 2 || 11
|-
|14 ||align=left|Wang Zhizhi || 19:52 || 5-8 || 63 || 1-1 || 100 || 0-0 || 0 || 1 || 5 || 6 || 2 || 2 || 0 || 0 || 0 || 11
|-
|15 ||align=left|Zhou Peng || 19:59 || 4-4 || 100 || 2-2 || 100 || 0-0 || 0 || 0 || 4 || 4 || 0 || 1 || 1 || 0 || 4 || 10
|-
|align=left colspan=2|Totals || || 33-65 || 51 || 9-22 || 41 || 13-17 || 76 || 8 || 36 || 44 || 16 || 9 || 2 || 1 || 13 || 88
|}

India vs. Korea

|-
|4 ||align=left|Sambhaji Kadam ||colspan=16 align=left|Did not play 
|-
|5 ||align=left|Narender Kumar Grewal ||18||0/4||0||0/4||0||0/0||0||0||0||0||0||3||1||0||0||0 
|-
|6 ||align=left|Pratham Singh ||31||7/12||58.33||4/6||66.67||1/1||100||0||0||0||1||0||0||1||0||18 
|-
|7 ||align=left|Vinay Kaushik ||colspan=16 align=left|Did not play 
|-
|8 ||align=left|Arjun Singh ||colspan=16 align=left|Did not play 
|-
|9 ||align=left|Vishesh Bhriguvanshi ||30||3/10||30||3/8||37.50||0/0||0||0||0||0||0||5||3||1||0||6 
|-
|10 ||align=left|Amritpal Singh ||6||1/2||50||1/2||50||0/0||0||1||3||4||0||0||2||0||0||2 
|-
|11 ||align=left|Joginder Singh ||31||4/10||40||2/4||50||0/0||0||1||3||4||2||5||3||0||0||10 
|-
|12 ||align=left|Satnam Singh Bhamara ||12||1/2||50||1/2||50||1/2||50||0||3||3||0||2||0||0||0||3 
|-
|13 ||align=left|Amjyot Singh ||21||1/6||16.67||1/5||20||2/2||100||1||4||5||1||4||4||0||1||4 
|-
|14 ||align=left|Yadwinder Singh ||24||0/4||0||0/2||0||0/0||0||1||3||4||3||3||2||0||0||0 
|-
|15 ||align=left|Rikin Shantilal Pethani ||23||5/9||55.56||5/9||55.56||1/3||33.33||2||1||3||1||1||0||0||0||11 
|-
|align=left colspan=2|Totals ||200||22/59||37.29||17/42||40.48||5/8||62.5||6||17||23||8||23||15||2||1||54
|}

|-
|4 ||align=left|Kim Min-Goo ||17||5/9||55.56||1/2||50||0/0||0||1||7||8||9||0||1||2||1||14 
|-
|5 ||align=left|Kim Sun-Hyung ||12||2/4||50||2/2||100||2/3||66.67||0||0||0||0||1||0||0||0||6 
|-
|6 ||align=left|Yang Dong-Geun ||17||4/5||80||2/2||100||0/0||0||0||4||4||8||0||2||1||0||10 
|-
|7 ||align=left|Kim Tae-Sul ||12||0/2||0||0/1||0||1/2||50||0||0||0||1||1||0||1||0||1 
|-
|8 ||align=left|Moon Seong-Gon ||10||0/3||0||0/1||0||1/2||50||0||1||1||0||1||0||1||0||1 
|-
|9 ||align=left|Yoon Ho-Young ||17||1/3||33.33||0/1||0||0/0||0||0||3||3||0||0||0||3||1||3 
|-
|10 ||align=left|Cho Sung-Min ||16||5/6||83.33||2/2||100||1/1||100||0||3||3||3||3||3||0||0||14 
|-
|11 ||align=left|Kim Joo-Sung ||15||3/5||60||3/5||60||2/3||66.67||1||1||2||1||0||0||0||1||8 
|-
|12 ||align=left|Kim Jong-Kyu ||20||1/2||50||1/2||50||5/6||83.33||1||2||3||0||3||1||1||1||7 
|-
|13 ||align=left|Choi Jun-Yong ||16||4/8||50||3/6||50||4/4||100||1||0||1||3||0||2||0||2||13 
|-
|14 ||align=left|Lee Seung-Jun ||23||4/6||66.67||4/6||66.67||2/2||100||0||3||3||2||3||0||0||2||10 
|-
|15 ||align=left|Lee Jong-Hyun ||20||4/7||57.14||4/7||57.14||2/2||100||0||3||3||2||3||0||0||2||10 
|-
|align=left colspan=2|Totals ||200||33/60||55||22/37||59.46||18/23||78.26||8||29||37||27||13||9||10||10||95
|}

Group F
Group
2013–14 in South Korean basketball
2013–14 in Chinese basketball
2013–14 in Kazakhstani basketball
2013 in Indian sport
2013 in Bahraini sport